Andi Aziz (19 September 1924 – 30 January 1984) was a Royal Dutch East Indies Army captain. He was born in Simpangbinangal, Barru, South Sulawesi. He led the 5 April 1950 Makassar Uprising in Sulawesi  against the Republic of the United States of Indonesia government. The purpose of the uprising was to revolt against the incorporation of the Indonesian federated "states" into the Indonesian Republic. The uprising was quashed, however, after two weeks when troops under Lt. Col. Suharto and Col. Alexander Evert Kawilarang arrived at Makassar only to find light resistance. Aziz was ordered by the army to return to Jakarta and was promptly arrested on arrival.

References 

1924 births
1984 deaths
20th-century Dutch East Indies people
People from Barru Regency
People of the Indonesian National Revolution